In enzymology, a holo-ACP synthase is an enzyme that catalyzes the chemical reaction

2'-(5"-triphosphoribosyl)-3'-dephospho-CoA + apo-citrate lyase  holo-citrate lyase + diphosphate

Thus, the two substrates of this enzyme are 2'-(5"-triphosphoribosyl)-3'-dephospho-CoA and apo-citrate lyase, whereas its two products are holo-citrate lyase and diphosphate.

This enzyme belongs to the family of transferases, specifically those transferring phosphorus-containing nucleotide groups (nucleotidyltransferases).  The systematic name of this enzyme class is 2'-(5"-triphosphoribosyl)-3'-dephospho-CoA:apo-citrate lyase adenylyltransferase. Other names in common use include 2'-(5"-phosphoribosyl)-3'-dephospho-CoA transferase, 2'-(5"-triphosphoribosyl)-3'-dephospho-CoA:apo-citrate lyase, and CitX.  This enzyme participates in two-component system - general.

Structural studies

As of late 2007, only one structure has been solved for this class of enzymes, with the PDB accession code .

References

 
 

EC 2.7.7
Enzymes of known structure